Mariam Ghani (Pashto/Dari: مریم غنی; born 1978) is an Afghan-American visual artist, photographer, filmmaker and social activist.

Biography
Mariam Ghani was born in 1978 in Brooklyn, New York,  of Afghan and Lebanese descent. Her father, Mohammad Ashraf Ghani, was president of Afghanistan.  Her mother, Rula Saade, is a Lebanese citizen. Ghani grew up in exile and was unable to travel to Afghanistan until 2002, at age 24. Her family lived in the suburbs of Maryland. Ghani earned her degrees from New York University and the School of Visual Arts in Manhattan in comparative literature and video photography and installation art. Ghani was an Eyebeam resident. She is a member of the Visual Arts Faculty at Bennington College.

Work 
Since 2004, Ghani has been working on a multi-media project entitled “Index of the Disappeared”, with her long-time collaborator Chitra Ganesh. The project is a record of the United States' detention of immigrants post-9/11 and public reaction to the treatment of immigrants. The project has grown and evolved over time, leading to a short film, How Do You See the Disappeared?,and a web project. Some of the other materials are transcripts, some are scraps of video or radio clips. She has presented her exhibits at the Transmediale Berlin (2003), Liverpool (2004), EMAP Seoul (2005), Tate Modern London (2007), the National Gallery Washington (2008), Beijing (2009) and Sharjah (2009, 2011).

In addition to the Index, she has made multiple film projects, like Like Water From a Stone a 2013 project Ghani filmed in Stavanger, Norway about the transformation the country underwent with the discovery of oil; or a 2014 short film made in Ferguson, Missouri looking at the social upheaval institutionalised inequity has created in the US. Other films, like The Trespassers, shown in Los Angeles in 2014, examines the problems inherent in translating languages. Ghani sees her use of digital media and technology as a toolkit for creating her art.

In addition to her creative art works, Ghani works as a journalist, and writes and lectures on issues affecting the diaspora and as a member of the Gulf Labor Working Group, which is an advocacy group for workers building museums in Abu Dhabi. She is also working as an archivist to digitize and reimage works produced between 1978 and 1991 by Afghan state filmmakers during the Communist period. She has also commented that Radio Television Afghanistan has an "amazingly rich archive of audiovisual material deserving of wider attention." Much of her work has a political component and speaks to systemic inequality in social systems and economics. She is both a women's rights and human rights activist.

Ghani's feature-length film What We Left Unfinished is a documentary of incomplete Afghan films created from 1978 to 1991. In a 2021 interview with Art Forum, Ghani described her film What We Left Unfinished as a reflection on Afghanistan's unsettled communist period, from unfinished artworks to unfinished to political movements.

References

External links

1978 births
Living people
American feminists
Afghan feminists
New York University alumni
Afghan artists
Afghan people of Arab descent
Filmmakers from New York (state)
American people of Afghan descent
American people of Lebanese descent
American people of Pashtun descent
Artists from Brooklyn
School of Visual Arts alumni
Bennington College faculty